Simone Severini is an Italian-born British computer scientist. He is currently Professor of Physics of Information at University College London, and Director of Quantum Computing at Amazon Web Services.

Work
Severini worked in quantum information science and complex systems. Together with Adan Cabello and Andreas Winter, he defined a graph-theoretic framework for studying quantum contextuality, and together with Tomasz Konopka, Fotini Markopoulou, and Lee Smolin, he introduced a random graph model of spacetime called quantum graphity. He served as an editor of Philosophical Transactions of the Royal Society A. In 2015 he was one of the first scientific advisors of Cambridge Quantum Computing, with Béla Bollobás, Imre Leader, and Fernando Brandão. In network theory, he co-introduced the Braunstein–Ghosh–Severini entropy, with applications to quantum gravity.

Publications

References 

Year of birth missing (living people)
Living people
British physicists
Quantum physicists
Academics of University College London